The Kandy Municipal Council (Sinhala: මහනුවර මහ නගර සභා Mahanuwara Maha Nagara Sabha) is the local council for Kandy, the second largest city and hill capital of Sri Lanka. The council was formed under the Municipalities Ordinance of 1865 and first met in 1866. The municipal council is the second oldest and largest local government authority in Sri Lanka. It has 41 elected representatives.

Kandy is a charter city, with a Mayor Council form of government. Mayor of Kandy  and the council members are elected through local government elections held once in five years. Head of administration is the Municipal Commissioner, who handles day-to-day operations of the 16 departments that it is made up of.

The Municipal Council provides sewer, road management and waste management services, in case of water, electricity and telephone utility services the council liaises with the Water Supply and Drainage Board, the Ceylon Electricity Board and telephone service providers.

The United National Party has always held control of the Council other than 2011–2015.

Structure 

In 2018, the number of seats of the council was increased to 41 and the United National Party became the ruling party following the local government elections that year.

Wards 

For electoral and administrative purposes, the Council is divided into 22 wards.

 Yatiwawala (යටිවාවල)      
 Senkadagala (සෙංකඩගල) 
 Galewatta (ගාලේවත්ත) 
 Mavilmada (මාවිල්මඩ) 
 Mahaweli Uyana (මහවැලිඋයන) 
 Watapuluwa (වටපුළුව) 
 Wattarantenna (වට්ටාරන්තැන්න) 
 Mapanawatura (මාපනාවතුර) 
 Anniwatta Dodamwala (අනිවත්ත දොඩම්වල) 
 Asgiriya (අස්ගිරිය) 
 Poornawatte West (පූර්ණවත්ත බටහිර) 
 Mahaiyawa (මහයියාව) 
 Aruppola (අරුප්පල) 
 Buwelikada (බූවැලිකඩ) 
 Ampitiya (අම්පිටිය) 
 Malwatta (මල්වත්ත) 
 Deiyannewela (දෙයියන්නේවල) 
 Katukale (කටුකැලේ) 
 Suduhumpola (සුදුහුම්පොල) 
 Mulgampola (මුල්ගම්පල) 
 Bowala (බෝවල) 
 Gatambe (ගැටඹේ)

List of mayors

See also
Municipal councils of Sri Lanka

References

Notes

External links 

 
1866 establishments in Ceylon
Local authorities in Central Province, Sri Lanka
Municipal councils of Sri Lanka